Molbo is a Danish cow's milk cheese made in the region of Mols. It is very similar to Edam, with a delicate, light flavour that is slightly tangy and salty. It has small, regular holes and, like Edam, is covered in a red wax coating. Made from cow milk, Molbo cheese is semi-hard in texture.

See also
 List of cheeses

Notes

External links

Danish cheeses
Cow's-milk cheeses